The Men's 10,000 metres at the 2018 European Athletics Championships took place at the Olympic Stadium on 7 August.

Records

Schedule

Results

References

10,000 metres M
10,000 metres at the European Athletics Championships